The  Washington Redskins season was the franchise's 10th season in the National Football League (NFL) and their 5th in Washington, D.C. The team failed to improve on their 9–2 record from 1940, finishing at 6-5 and missed the playoffs.

Schedule

Standings 

Washington
Washington Redskins seasons
Washington Redskins